Nikola Mektić and Mate Pavić defeated Marcel Granollers and Horacio Zeballos in the final, 6–4, 7–6(7–5), 2–6, 7–5 to win the gentlemen's doubles title at the 2021 Wimbledon Championships. It was their eighth title of the season, with Mektić winning his maiden major doubles title and Pavić winning his third (following the 2018 Australian Open and 2020 US Open). They became the first Croatian pair to win the title.

Juan Sebastián Cabal and Robert Farah were the defending champions from when the tournament was last held in 2019, but lost to Rajeev Ram and Joe Salisbury in the quarterfinals.

Pavić and Nicolas Mahut were in contention for the ATP No. 1 doubles ranking. By winning his first round match, Pavić retained the top ranking.

Because of a delay in schedule due to rain, the first two rounds of the competition were played best-of-three sets instead of the usual best-of-five format.

Seeds

Draw

Finals

Top half

Section 1

Section 2

Bottom half

Section 3

Section 4

Other entry information

Wild cards

Protected ranking

Alternates

Withdrawals
During the tournament
  Lloyd Glasspool /  Harri Heliövaara

Retirements

See also
2021 Wimbledon Championships – Day-by-day summaries

References

External links
 Gentlemen's Doubles draw
 2021 Wimbledon Championships – Men's draws and results at the International Tennis Federation

Men's Doubles
Wimbledon Championship by year – Men's doubles